Bromsgrove Sporting Football Club is a football club based in Bromsgrove, Worcestershire, England. The club was founded in 2009 and played their first season, 2010–11, in Midland Football Combination Division Two, where they ended third.

History
Bromsgrove Sporting club was founded in 2009 as a supporters consortium with the plan to buy Bromsgrove Rovers, and to take that football club out of administration. The supporters trust had become dissatisfied with the ownership and chairmanship of Tom Herbert, who had taken the club into administration. The administrator identified and preferred another potential buyer for the Rovers club (who it had been suggested had links to Tom Herbert, and who subsequently failed to pay the agreed purchase money and was later made bankrupt by the administrator). The consortium took it upon themselves to create a team to safeguard non-league football in Bromsgrove. 
On 2 June 2010 Sporting were offered the lease of the Victoria Ground, after they had promised to make the ground available for Bromsgrove Rovers fixtures too. In August 2010, Bromsgrove Rovers were expelled from the Southern League, despite Sporting agreeing to make the Victoria Ground available, and the Rovers club was subsequently dissolved. Bromsgrove Sporting thus inherited sole use of the Victoria Ground.  

After high finishes in their first few seasons, and league re-organisations which led to their elevation from Midland Football Combination Division Two and Division One, for season 2012–13 Bromsgrove Sporting were promoted to the Midland Football Combination Premier Division.

On 10 May 2014, in front of a crowd of 414 at the Victoria Ground, Bromsgrove, Sporting's first team lifted their first piece of silverware, recording a 4–1 victory over Paget Rangers in the final of the Smedley Crooke Memorial Charity Cup with goals by Danny Ludlow (2) & Billy Russell (2).

As of season 2014–15 the league was rebranded Midland Football League (MFL) after the Midland Football Combination merged with the Midland Alliance. Sporting played that season in the First Division of the MFL.

Bromsgrove gained a reputation for being the perennial bridesmaids, finishing 2nd for three consecutive years prior to 2016–17 in a league that offers just the one promotion place. However the  2016–17 season saw the club finish as champions and thus gaining promotion to the MFL Premier Division at last, becoming 'invincibles' in the process as the side remained unbeaten in the league. Sporting also reached the semi finals of the F.A. Vase, before being edged out 2–1 on aggregate by Cleethorpes Town one game from Wembley. Season 2017–18 saw Sporting become champions of the MFL Premier Division at their first attempt, thus achieving back to back promotions and securing a place in the Southern League Division One Central for season 2018–19. The club also won The Worcestershire FA Senior Urn for the second successive season.

The 2018-19 season saw The Rouslers finish in second place to Peterborough Sports, but after winning the Division One Central Play-Off Semi-Final against Sutton Coldfield 3-2 AET and the Final against Corby Town 4-3 AET in front of a crowd of 2,943 at the Victoria Ground, Sporting were once again promoted, to the Southern League Premier Central Division, for the 2019-20 season. The Southern League curtailed fixtures for that season following the outbreak of the Covid-19 pandemic in March 2020. Sporting were in 4th place in the Division at that point with 10 matches remaining unplayed. Season 2020-21 was also curtailed, after just eight league matches, for the same reason. However Sporting did manage to secure the Red Recruitment Trophy, a one-off local initiative played between Worcestershire-based Non-League Step 3 teams, beating Alvechurch 1-0 in the Final in May 2021.  '

Season 2021-22 (the club's 12th season and the first completed in full after the lifting of pandemic restrictions) saw a dramatic reversal in Sporting's fortunes on the field. Mixed results in the team's Southern League matches saw them in 11th position by mid-October. However a heavy home defeat by National League Grimsby Town in a televised FA Cup 4th Qualifying Round fixture was followed by a run of adverse league results such that by mid-March 2022, after a home defeat by Biggleswade Town, Sporting slid into the relegation zone. Something never experienced before for a club used to continued success on the field. The team rallied however and gained enough points in subsequent matches to move to safety, finishing the league season in 18th position. Some 40 different players had turned out for the club at some point during the season, with an almost constant turnover in playing personnel.

Attendances
Being the in-spirit replacement of Bromsgrove Rovers, Sporting had a much higher average attendance than the other teams in the Midland Football League. Their inaugural season had a home average attendance of 293 and their average for 2016–17 was 671. This increased again in 2017–18 (league and cup combined) to 721.

Sporting's record home attendance was on 11 March 2017 where 3,349 attended the FA Vase Semi-Final first leg match against Cleethorpes Town.  The return leg a week later at Cleethorpes attracted a crowd of 1,154. Sporting's record home league attendance at the Victoria Ground to date was on 11 January 2020 when a crowd of 1,764 saw them beat Tamworth 1–0 in a Southern League Premier Central Division fixture.  An away fixture in the MFL against ground tenants Worcester City on 26 December 2017 (also played at the Victoria Ground) attracted 1,672 fans. As mentioned above, although not strictly a 'home' fixture the Southern League Division One Central play-off final on 6 May 2019 attracted 2,943 supporters to the Victoria Ground. Before the Cleethorpes FA Vase match the best attended match Sporting had been involved in away from the Victoria Ground was 550 in the final of the Les James Challenge Cup on 6 May 2015 at Bescot Stadium, where they beat Southam United 3–2, with "The Rouslers" taking approximately 450 fans to Walsall.. In 2017–18 the Worcestershire FA Senior Urn final against Lye Town at Kidderminster's Aggborough Stadium, won by Bromsgrove on penalties, attracted 642 spectators.

In 2016–17 Sporting played at Step Six of the non-league pyramid, and had the highest average league attendance of any team at that level in the country. This achievement was repeated in 2017–18 at pyramid Step Five level with home league attendances averaging 777, and again in 2018-19 at Step Four level with home league gates averaging 952 (boosted to 1,090 with the inclusion of the play-off games), making Bromsgrove Sporting the 43rd best-supported team in non-League football. In the curtailed 2019-20 season at Step Three level (Southern League Premier Central Division) Sporting's 17 home league matches attracted an average of 979 supporters.

Despite the team's adverse results, the completed 2021-22 season saw only a modest reduction in home attendances, with the 27 league and cup matches at the Victoria Ground attracting an average of 849 supporters. The highest attendance was 3,219 for the FA Cup match against Grimsby Town.

Players

Current squad
 

The Southern Football League does not use a squad numbering system.

Former players
See Bromsgrove Sporting F.C. players

International players
Players signed to, or have played for Bromsgrove Sporting that have had full international caps during their careers.

|-
|valign="top"|

Gibraltar
 Reece Styche

Montserrat
 Marshall Willock

|width="33"| 
|valign="top"|

Saint Lucia
 Melanius Mullarkey

|width="33"| 
|valign="top"|

Saint Kitts and Nevis
 Tesfa Robinson

|width="33"| 
|valign="top"|

Somalia
 Ahmed Ali

Management and coaching staff

Boardroom

Current Staff

Managerial History

Seasons

See also
Bromsgrove Sporting F.C. players
List of fan-owned sports teams

References

External links
Bromsgrove Sporting Official website

 
2009 establishments in England
Association football clubs established in 2009
Bromsgrove
Fan-owned football clubs in England
Football clubs in Worcestershire
Midland Football Combination
Midland Football League
Phoenix clubs (association football)
Southern Football League clubs